Chester is a cathedral city and the county town of Cheshire, England, on the River Dee, close to the English–Welsh border. With a population of 79,645 in 2011, it is the most populous settlement of Cheshire West and Chester (a unitary authority which had a population of 329,608 in 2011) and serves as its administrative headquarters. It is also the historic county town of Cheshire and the second-largest settlement in Cheshire after Warrington.

Chester was founded in 79 AD as a "castrum" or Roman fort with the name Deva Victrix during the reign of Emperor Vespasian. One of the main army camps in Roman Britain, Deva later became a major civilian settlement. In 689, King Æthelred of Mercia founded the Minster Church of West Mercia, which later became Chester's first cathedral, and the Angles extended and strengthened the walls to protect the city against the Danes. Chester was one of the last cities in England to fall to the Normans, and William the Conqueror ordered the construction of a castle to dominate the town and the nearby Welsh border. Chester was granted city status in 1541.

The city walls of Chester are some of the best-preserved in the country and have Grade I listed status. It has a number of medieval buildings, but many of the black-and-white buildings within the city centre are Victorian restorations, originating from the Black-and-white Revival movement. Apart from a  section, the walls are almost complete. The Industrial Revolution brought railways, canals, and new roads to the city, which saw substantial expansion and development; Chester Town Hall and the Grosvenor Museum are examples of Victorian architecture from this period. Tourism, the retail industry, public administration, and financial services are important to the modern economy. Chester signs itself as Chester International Heritage City on road signs on the main roads entering the city.

History

Charles Leigh concluded in 1701 that there was probably a British city called Genuina (or Gunia) before the arrival of the Romans.

Roman

The Roman Legio II Adiutrix during the reign of the Emperor Vespasian founded Chester in AD 79, as a "castrum" or Roman fort with the name Deva Victrix. It was established in the land of the Celtic Cornovii, according to ancient cartographer Ptolemy, as a fortress during the Roman expansion northward, and was named Deva either after the goddess of the Dee, or directly from the British name for the river. The 'victrix' part of the name was taken from the title of the Legio XX Valeria Victrix which was based at Deva.  Central Chester's four main roads, Eastgate, Northgate, Watergate and Bridgegate, follow routes laid out at this time.

A civilian settlement grew around the military base, probably originating from trade with the fortress. The fortress was 20% larger than other fortresses in the Roman province of Britannia built around the same time at York (Eboracum) and Caerleon (Isca Augusta); this has led to the suggestion that the fortress, rather than London (Londinium), was intended to become the capital of the Roman province of Britannia Superior. The civilian amphitheatre, which was built in the 1st century, could seat between 8,000 and 10,000 people. It is the largest known military amphitheatre in Britain, and is also a Scheduled Monument. The Minerva Shrine in the Roman quarry is the only rock cut Roman shrine still in situ in Britain.

The fortress was garrisoned by the legion until at least the late 4th century. Although the army had abandoned the fortress by 410 when the Romans retreated from Britannia, the Romano-British civilian settlement continued (probably with some Roman veterans staying behind with their wives and children) and its occupants probably continued to use the fortress and its defences as protection from raiders from the Irish Sea.

Medieval

After the Roman troops withdrew, the Romano-British established a number of petty kingdoms. Chester is thought to have become part of Powys. Deverdoeu was a Welsh name for Chester as late as the 12th century (cf Dyfrdwy, Welsh for the river Dee). (The town's importance is noted by its taking the simpler form in each case, while Isca Augusta in Monmouthshire, another important legionary base, was known first as Caerleon on the Usk, and now as Caerleon). King Arthur is said to have fought his ninth battle at the "city of the legions" (Caerlleon) and later St Augustine came to the city to try to unite the church, and held his synod with the Welsh Bishops.

In 616, Æthelfrith of Northumbria defeated a Welsh army at the brutal and decisive Battle of Chester, and probably established the Anglo-Saxon position in the area from then on. The Northumbrian Anglo-Saxons used an Old English equivalent of the British name, which was current until the 11th century, when, in a further parallel with Welsh usage, the first element fell out of use and the simple name Chester emerged. In 689, King Æthelred of Mercia founded the Minster Church of West Mercia on what is considered to be an early Christian site: it is known as the Minster of St John the Baptist, Chester (now St John's Church) which later became the first cathedral. Much later, the body of Æthelred's niece, St Werburgh, was removed from Hanbury in Staffordshire in the 9th century and, to save it from desecration by Danish marauders, was reburied in the Church of SS Peter & Paul – later to become the Abbey Church (the present cathedral). Her name is still remembered in St Werburgh's Street which passes alongside the cathedral, and near the city walls.

The Anglo-Saxons extended and strengthened the walls of Chester to protect the city against the Danes, who occupied it for a short time until Alfred seized all the cattle and laid waste the surrounding land to drive them out. It was Alfred's daughter Æthelflæd, Lady of the Mercians, that built the new Anglo-Saxon burh. A new Church dedicated to St Peter alone was founded in AD 907 by the Lady Æthelfleda at what was to become the Cross. In 973, the Anglo-Saxon Chronicle records that, two years after his coronation at Bath, King Edgar of England came to Chester where he held his court in a palace in a place now known as Edgar's Field near the old Dee bridge in Handbridge. Taking the helm of a barge, he was rowed the short distance up the River Dee from Edgar's Field to the great Minster Church of St John the Baptist by six (the monk Henry Bradshaw records he was rowed by eight kings) tributary kings called reguli.

In 1071, King William the Conqueror made Hugh d'Avranches, who built Chester Castle, the first Earl of Chester (second creation). From the 14th century to the 18th century the city's prominent position in North West England meant that it was commonly also known as Westchester. This name was used by Celia Fiennes when she visited the city in 1698. and is also used in Moll Flanders.

Early modern period

In the English Civil War, Chester sided with the royalist cause of King Charles I, but was subdued by the Parliamentarians in 1643. The Mayor of Chester, Charles Walley, was removed from office and replaced by Alderman William Edwards. Another alderman, Francis Gamull, a royalist MP and former Mayor, was ordered to surrender Dee Mills: they were to be demolished, and new mills built on city land.

Industrial history

Chester played a significant part in the Industrial Revolution which began in the North West of England in the latter part of the 18th century. The city village of Newtown, located north east of the city and bounded by the Shropshire Union Canal was at the very heart of this industry. The large Chester Cattle Market and the two Chester railway stations, Chester General and Chester Northgate Station, meant that Newtown with its cattle market and canal, and Hoole with its railways were responsible for providing the vast majority of workers and in turn, the vast amount of Chester's wealth production throughout the Industrial Revolution.

The population was 23,115 by 1841.

Modern era

A considerable amount of land in Chester is owned by The 7th Duke of Westminster who owns an estate, Eaton Hall, near the village of Eccleston. He also has London properties in Mayfair.

Grosvenor is the Duke's family name, which explains such features in the city as the Grosvenor Bridge, the Grosvenor Hotel, and Grosvenor Park. Much of Chester's architecture dates from the Victorian era, many of the buildings being modeled on the Jacobean half-timbered style and designed by John Douglas, who was employed by the Duke as his principal architect. He had a trademark of twisted chimney stacks, many of which can be seen on the buildings in the city centre.

Douglas designed amongst other buildings the Grosvenor Hotel and the City Baths. In 1911, Douglas' protégé and city architect James Strong designed the then active fire station on the west side of Northgate Street. Another feature of all buildings belonging to the estate of Westminster is the 'Grey Diamonds' – a weaving pattern of grey bricks in the red brickwork laid out in a diamond formation.

Towards the end of World War II, a lack of affordable housing meant many problems for Chester. Large areas of farmland on the outskirts of the city were developed as residential areas in the 1950s and early 1960s, producing, for instance, the suburb of Blacon. In 1964, a bypass was built through and around the city centre to combat traffic congestion.

These new developments caused local concern as the physicality and therefore the feel of the city was being dramatically altered. In 1968, a report by Donald Insall in collaboration with authorities and government recommended that historic buildings be preserved in Chester. Consequently, the buildings were used in new and different ways instead of being demolished.

In 1969 the City Conservation Area was designated. Over the next 20 years the emphasis was placed on saving historic buildings, such as The Falcon Inn, Dutch Houses and Kings Buildings.

On 13 January 2002, Chester was granted Fairtrade City status. This status was renewed by the Fairtrade Foundation on 20 August 2003.

Governance

Chester is an unparished area within the unitary authority of Cheshire West and Chester as of 1 April 2009 replacing the old Chester City Council and the local ward is the City ward electing three councillors. A small area around Chester Castle remains a civil parish of Chester Castle. The Member of Parliament for the City of Chester is Samantha Dixon (Labour), who has held the seat since a by-election in 2022.

Chester is twinned with: Sens, France; Lörrach, Germany; Lakewood, Colorado, USA; and Senigallia, Italy.

Geography

Chester lies at the southern end of a  Triassic sandstone ridge that rises to a height of 42 m within a natural S-bend in the River Dee (before the course was altered in the 18th century). The bedrock, which is also known as the Chester Pebble Beds, is noticeable because of the many small stones trapped within its strata. Retreating glacial sheet ice also deposited quantities of sand and marl across the area where boulder clay was absent.

The eastern and northern part of Chester consisted of heathland and forest. The western side towards the Dee Estuary was marsh and wetland habitats.

Climate
Chester has an oceanic climate (Köppen: Cfb), typical of the British Isles but more susceptible to cold than the extreme south. Despite its proximity to the Irish Sea, the temperature regime is similar to areas further inland, owing to the shelter provided by the Pennines to the northeast and the Welsh Mountains to the southwest.

Often given the correctly aligned breezy conditions, a föhn effect will operate, meaning local temperatures are somewhat higher than surrounding area.

The absolute minimum temperature recorded was  during January 1982. Annually, an average of 42.2 air frosts should be recorded.

Annual rainfall is barely over 700mm due to a rain shadow effect caused by the Welsh Mountains. Over 1mm of rain is reported on 135.5 days.

Divisions and suburbs

The Chester Urban Area is an urban area surrounding the city of Chester. The urban area includes the town of Saltney in Flintshire, North Wales and the outlying suburbs of Bache, Blacon, Boughton, Curzon Park, Great Boughton, Handbridge, Huntington, Hoole, Kingsway, Lache, Moston, Newton, Newtown, Queens Park, Upton, Vicars Cross, and Westminster Park.

Areas just outside the city include: Christleton, Eccleston, Guilden Sutton, Littleton, Mickle Trafford, Mollington, Saughall and Waverton.

Landmarks and tourist attractions

The more unusual landmarks in the city are the city walls, the Rows and the black-and-white architecture. The only break in the circuit is in the southwest section in front of County Hall. A footpath runs along the top of the walls, crossing roads by bridges over Eastgate, Northgate, St Martin's Gate, Watergate, Bridgegate, Newgate, and the Wolf Gate, and passing a series of structures, namely Phoenix Tower (or King Charles' Tower), Morgan's Mount, the Goblin Tower (or Pemberton's Parlour), and Bonewaldesthorne's Tower with a spur leading to the Water Tower, and Thimbleby's Tower. On Eastgate is Eastgate Clock which is said to be the most photographed clock face in England after those that share the tower with Big Ben.

The Rows are unique in Britain. They consist of buildings with shops or dwellings on the lowest two storeys. The shops or dwellings on the ground floor are often lower than the street and are entered by steps, which sometimes lead to a crypt-like vault. Those on the first floor are entered behind a continuous walkway, often with a sloping shelf between the walkway and the railings overlooking the street. Much of the architecture of central Chester looks medieval and some of it is, but by far the greater part of it, including most of the black-and-white buildings, is Victorian, a result of what Pevsner termed the "black-and-white revival".

The most prominent buildings in the city centre are the town hall and the cathedral. The town hall was opened in 1869. It is in Gothic Revival style and has a tower and a short spire. The cathedral was formerly the church of St Werburgh's Abbey. Its architecture dates back to the Norman era, with additions made most centuries since. A series of major restorations took place in the 19th century and in 1975 a separate bell tower was opened. The elaborately carved canopies of the choir stalls are considered to be among the finest in the country. Also in the cathedral is the shrine of St Werburgh. To the north of the cathedral are the former monastic buildings. The oldest church in the city is St John's, which is outside the city walls and was at one time the cathedral church. The church was shortened after the dissolution of the monasteries and ruins of the former east end remain outside the church. Much of the interior is in Norman style and this is considered to be the best example of 11th–12th-century church architecture in Cheshire. At the intersection of the former Roman roads is Chester Cross, to the north of which is the small church of St Peter's, which is in use as an ecumenical centre. Other churches are now redundant and have other uses: St Michael's in Bridge Street is a heritage centre, St Mary-on-the-Hill is an educational centre, and Holy Trinity now acts as the Guildhall. Other notable buildings include the preserved shot tower, the highest structure in Chester, and St Thomas of Canterbury Church.

Roman remains can still be found in the city, particularly in the basements of some of the buildings and in the lower parts of the northern section of the city walls. The most important Roman feature is the amphitheatre just outside the walls, which underwent archaeological investigation in the early 21st century. Roman artefacts are on display in the Roman Gardens which run parallel to the city walls from Newgate to the River Dee, where there's also a reconstructed hypocaust system. An original hypocaust system discovered in the 1720s can be seen in the basement of 39 Bridge Street, which is open to the public.

Of the medieval city, the most important surviving structure is Chester Castle, particularly the Agricola Tower. Much of the rest of the castle has been replaced by the neoclassical county court and its entrance, the Propyleum. To the south of the city runs the River Dee, with its 11th-century weir. The river is crossed by the Old Dee Bridge, dating from the 13th century, the Grosvenor Bridge of 1832, and Queen's Park suspension bridge (for pedestrians). To the south-west of the city, the River Dee curves towards the north. The area between the river and the city walls here is known as the Roodee, and contains Chester Racecourse which holds a series of horse races and other events. The first recorded race meet in England at Roodee Fields was on 9 February 1540. The Shropshire Union Canal runs to the north of the city and a branch leads from it to the River Dee.

The major museum in Chester is the Grosvenor Museum, which includes a collection of Roman tombstones and an art gallery. Associated with the museum is 20 Castle Street in which rooms are furnished in different historical styles. The Deva Roman Experience has hands-on exhibits and a reconstructed Roman street. One of the blocks in the forecourt of the Castle houses the Cheshire Military Museum.

The major public park in Chester is Grosvenor Park. On the south side of the River Dee, in Handbridge, is Edgar's Field, another public park, which contains Minerva's Shrine, a Roman shrine to the goddess Minerva. A war memorial to those who died in the world wars is in the town hall and it contains the names of all Chester servicemen who died in the First World War.

There are cruises on the River Dee and on the Shropshire Union Canal, and guided open-air bus tours. The river cruises and bus tours start from a riverside area known as the Groves, which contains seating and a bandstand. A series of festivals is organised in the city, including mystery plays, a summer music festival and a literature festival. There is a Tourist Information Centre at the town hall.

The Cheshire Police constabulary was historically based in the city from its foundation in 1857. Originally on Seller Street, its headquarters moved to Egerton Street (both since redeveloped), and then from 1870 to 113 Foregate Street, where Parkers Buildings now stand. In 1883, the police headquarters moved to 142 Foregate Street, Chester, now preserved as a Grade II listed building. The county police headquarters has since moved again, in 1967 to Nuns Road before leaving the city in 2003 for Clemonds Hey, Winsford.

Demography

According to the 2011 census, Chester had a large White British proportion of around 110,000 or 90.9% of the population. 1.0% described themselves as Irish. 3.6% as Other White. 2.2% described themselves as Asian. 1.3% described themselves as Mixed Race. 0.6% described themselves as Black or Black British and 0.3% are classed as other. Cheshire West and Chester also has a large number of Christians at 76.4%. 14% have no religion and 8.2% are not stated. 0.7% are Muslim. 0.1% are Sikhs. 0.1% are Jewish. 0.2% are Buddhists.

The population was forecast to grow by 5% in the period 2005 to 2021. The resident population for Chester District in the 2001 Census was 118,200. This represents 17.5% of the Cheshire County total (1.8% of the North West population).

Education
The city is home to the University of Chester. Formerly a teacher training college, it gained full university status in 2005 and is the county's main provider of tertiary education. The University of Law also has a campus in nearby Christleton.

Cheshire College – South & West is a vocational college with campuses in Handbridge as well as Ellesmere Port and Crewe.

The King's School, a private school, was established by King Henry VIII in 1541. The girls-only Queen's School, another independent school, was founded in 1878.

Other secondary schools include:
Bishops' Blue Coat C of E
Catholic High School
Queens Park High School
Upton-by-Chester High School
Blacon High School
Christleton High School

Culture

The major museum in Chester is the Grosvenor Museum which includes a collection of Roman tombstones and an art gallery. Associated with the museum is 20 Castle Street in which rooms are furnished in different historical styles. The Dewa Roman Experience has hands-on exhibits and a reconstructed Roman street. One of the blocks in the forecourt of Chester Castle houses the Cheshire Military Museum.

The £37m Storyhouse arts centre opened in the city centre in 2017, and includes a theatre, cinema, restaurant and the city's main library. It is housed in the city's remodelled 1936 Odeon Cinema, and replaces the Gateway Theatre and the former library on Northgate Street.

Chester Little Theatre is based in Newtown and run by Chester Theatre Club. It generally stages 5 or 6 plays each year. Chester Music Theatre is based in a converted church in Boughton. There was a multiplex cinema and a ten pin bowling alley at Greyhound Retail Park on the edge of the city but these have closed and the cinema has moved to Broughton, just over the border in North Wales. A new Picturehouse multi-screen cinema is being built in the city centre as part of the Northgate Project, due for completion in 2022. Chester has its own film society, a number of amateur dramatic societies and theatre schools.

The Groves area of Chester is the location of a Grade II listed bandstand, built in 1913. A programme of afternoon performances runs every weekend and Bank Holiday from May to August each year, which usually includes brass bands, choirs, jazz, blues and acoustic performers. The current Bandstand Coordinator is Luke Moore, who was appointed in 2018 and has expanded the programme to include a mixture of visual art, theatre, poetry and community events, alongside a variety of musical performances.

Grosvenor Park Open Air Theatre, founded in 2010, is the only site-specific professional open-air theatre company outside London. It has an eight-week annual summer repertory season.

To the east side of the city is Chester Zoo, the UK's largest zoo with over 11,000 animals in 110 acres of award-winning gardens.

Numerous pubs, nightclubs and bars, some of which are based in medieval buildings, populate the city.

Music

Chester has had a professional classical music festival – the Chester Summer Music Festival, since 1967 and regularly from 1978. The festival went into liquidation in 2012. A major new music festival was launched in March 2013 (previously known as Chester Performs), running annually every summer. The Chester Music Festival features the professional music group Ensemble Deva led by Giovanni Guzzo and Music Director Clark Rundell. Ensemble Deva regularly features soloists and section leaders from the country's leading symphony orchestras including Liverpool Philharmonic, the Hallé and Manchester Camerata.

The composer Howard Skempton was born in Chester in 1947.

Chester has a brass band that was formed in 1853. It was known as the Blue Coat Band and today as The City of Chester Band. It is a third section brass band with a training band. Its members wear a blue-jacketed uniform with an image of the Eastgate clock on the breast pocket of the blazer.

Chester Music Society was founded in 1948 as a small choral society. It now encompasses four sections: The Choir has 170 members drawn from Chester and the surrounding district; The Youth Choirs support three choirs: Youth Choir, Preludes, and the Alumni Choir; Celebrity Concerts promote a season of six high quality concerts each year; The club is a long established section which aims to encourage young musicians and in many cases offers the first opportunity to perform in public.

The Chester Philharmonic Orchestra (CPO) was founded in 1884 and is one of the premier non-professional orchestras in North West England. Formerly the Chester Orchestral Society they perform music from a wide repertoire. The Orchestra is a registered charity and usually perform four or five concerts, under the direction of well known professional conductors, each year (including an annual carol concert), which take place in the magnificent setting of Chester's ancient Cathedral.

Telford's Warehouse, Alexander's Jazz Bar and The Live Rooms are the city's main live music venues.

An annual popular music festival started in 2011 called Chester Rocks. It is held on the grounds of the Chester Racecourse.

The founder members of the band River City People (guitarist Tim Speed, his drummer brother Paul Speed) are from Chester. They had a number of hits in the early 1990s. Later into the same decade, Mansun formed in the city, after singer Paul Draper met guitarist Dominic Chad whilst working in the local former Fat Cat Bar. More recently, Shy and the Fight, featuring Chester-based musicians, have achieved national attention via airplay on Radio 1 and Radio 2, also appearing at Wychwood and Swn festivals. Other bands that have gone on to achieve a degree of success outside of the city include The Suns, The Wayriders, Motion Empire, Casino and Face Of Christ and The Lovelies.

Media
Chester's newspapers include the weekly paid-for Chester Chronicle and freesheet Chester Standard. The Chester Evening Leader and Midweek Chronicle are no longer in publication.

Chester's Dee Radio is the city's radio station, with Heart North West, Capital North West and Wales and BBC Radio Merseyside also broadcasting locally. Lache FM is currently Chester's only Community radio station.

Television in Chester is usually served by BBC North West Tonight and ITV Granada, and with its close proximity with North Wales, viewers can also receive BBC Wales Today and ITV Cymru Wales rather than their local relays, Chester is where Channel 4's soap-opera Hollyoaks is set (although most filming takes place around Liverpool).

Economy

Chester's main industries are now the service industries comprising tourism, retail, public administration and financial services. Many domestic and international tourists visit to view the city's landmarks and heritage with a complementary benefit to hotels and restaurants.

The city's central shopping area includes its unique Rows or galleries (two levels of shops) which date from medieval times and are believed to include the oldest shop front in England. The city has many chain stores, and also features an indoor market, a department store (Browns of Chester, now absorbed by the Debenhams chain), and two main indoor shopping centres: The Grosvenor Shopping Centre and the Forum (a reference to the city's Roman past). There are retail parks to the west and south. Cheshire Oaks Designer Outlet and Broughton Retail Park are near the city.

Chester has a relatively large financial sector including Bank of America, MBNA, NFU Mutual, Lloyds Bank, Virgin Money, Quilter, Diners Club International and M&S Bank. The price comparison website moneysupermarket.com is based over the Welsh border in Ewloe. Chester has its own university, the University of Chester, and a major hospital, the Countess of Chester Hospital, named after Diana, Princess of Wales and Countess of Chester.

Just over the Welsh border to the west, Broughton is home to a large Airbus UK factory (formerly British Aerospace), employing around 6,000 staff, where the wings of the Airbus aeroplanes are manufactured, and there are food processing plants to the north and west. The Iceland frozen food company is based in nearby Deeside.

Developments

In 2007 Chester City Council announced a 10-year plan to see Chester become a "must see European destination". At a cost of £1.3 billion it was branded Chester Renaissance.

The Northgate Development project began in 2007 with the demolition of St. Martin's House on the city's ring road. At a cost of £460 million, Chester City Council and developers ING hoped to create a new quarter for Chester. The development was intended see the demolition of the market hall, bus station, theatre and NCP car park. They were to be replaced with a multi-storey car park, bus exchange, performing arts centre, library, homes, retail space and a department store which will be anchored by House of Fraser. There project was put on hold in 2008 due to the economic downturn. However a number of Chester's other Renaissance projects continued, including a new health centre, offices and apartments in the Delamere Street development, and a hotel and new headquarters for Cheshire West and Chester Council in the £60million HQ development. Work on a new bus station started in October 2015 and it opened in June 2017. The Northgate Project is now being led by the council and is due to include a new market hall, cinema, multi-storey car park and restaurant units on the site of the former bus exchange. Building work has begun and is due to be completed in 2022.

Transport

Roads
The city is a hub for major roads, including the M53 motorway towards the Wirral Peninsula and Liverpool and the M56 motorway towards Manchester. The A55 road runs along the North Wales coast to Holyhead and the A483 links the city to nearby Wrexham and Swansea in Wales.

Bus transport in the city is provided by Stagecoach Merseyside & South Lancashire and Arriva Buses Wales, the council owned and operated ChesterBus (formerly Chester City Transport) having been sold to First Chester & The Wirral in mid-2007. A new bus exchange is being built in the city at Gorse Stacks is scheduled for completion in early 2017. In October 2016, a new regular EasyBus service began from Chester to Manchester Airport.

Railways
Chester formerly had two railway stations: Chester General remains in, use but Chester Northgate closed in 1969 as a result of the Beeching cuts. Chester Northgate, which was north-east of the city centre, opened in 1875 as a terminus for the Cheshire Lines Committee. Trains travelled via Northwich to Manchester Central. Later services also went to Seacombe (Wallasey) and Wrexham Central via . It was demolished in the 1970s and the site is now part of the Northgate Arena leisure centre.

Chester General, which opened in 1848, was designed with an Italianate frontage. It now has seven designated platforms but once had fourteen. The station lost its original roof in the 1972 Chester General rail crash. In September 2007, extensive renovations took place to improve pedestrian access, and parking. The present station has staffed ticket offices and barriers, waiting rooms, toilets, shops and a pedestrian bridge with lifts. Chester General also had a large marshalling yard and a motive power depot, most of which has now been replaced with housing.

Normal scheduled departures from Chester station are: a quarter-hourly Merseyrail electric service on the Wirral Line to Liverpool, half-hourly in the evenings and on Sundays; frequent services on the North Wales Coast Line (thereby connecting with Holyhead for ferries to Dublin); Avanti West Coast to London Euston via Crewe and to Holyhead; Transport for Wales to Manchester Piccadilly via Warrington Bank Quay and Cardiff Central/Birmingham International via Wrexham General as well as North Wales Coast Line trains to Crewe, Llandudno Junction, Llandudno, Holyhead; and Northern to Manchester Piccadilly via Northwich.

In May 2019, Northern introduced a Chester to Leeds via Warrington Bank Quay, Manchester Victoria and Bradford Interchange. In May 2019, Transport for Wales introduced a service to Liverpool Lime Street, via the reopened Halton Curve and offering a rail connection to Liverpool Airport at Liverpool South Parkway.

In late 1847, the Dee bridge disaster occurred when a bridge span collapsed as a train passed over the River Dee by the Roodee. Five people were killed in the accident. The bridge had been designed and built by famed-railway engineer Robert Stephenson for the Chester and Holyhead Railway. A Royal Commission inquiry found that the trusses were made of cast iron beams that had inadequate strength for their purpose. A national scandal ensued and many new bridges of similar design were either taken down or heavily altered.

Cycling
There are a series of colour-coded signposted cycling routes around the city.

On 19 June 2008, then Secretary of State for Transport Ruth Kelly named Chester as a cycling demonstration town. This initiative allowed for substantial financial support to improve cycling facilities, and a number of schemes were planned.

Potential schemes included a new pedestrian and cycling bridge across the River Dee, linking the Meadows with Huntington and Great Boughton, an access route between Curzon Park and the Roodee, an extension to the existing greenway route from Hoole to Guilden Sutton and Mickle Trafford, and an access route between the Millennium cycle route and Deva Link. However, following a reorganisation of the local authorities effective 1 April 2009 the Conservative-led administration of the newly established Cheshire West and Chester council was not very supportive, so comparatively little was actually achieved.

Many of the ideas generated at the time were captured in a Cycle Chester Masterplan document.

Canals

The Chester Canal had locks down to the River Dee. Canal boats could enter the river at high tide to load goods directly onto seagoing vessels. The port facilities at Crane Wharf, by Chester racecourse, made an important contribution to the commercial development of the north-west region.

The original Chester Canal was constructed to run from the River Dee near Sealand Road, to Nantwich in south Cheshire, and opened in 1774. In 1805, the Wirral section of the Ellesmere Canal was opened, which ran from Netherpool (now known as Ellesmere Port) to meet the Chester Canal at Chester canal basin. Later, those two canal branches became part of the Shropshire Union Canal network. This canal, which runs beneath the northern section of the city walls of Chester, is navigable and remains in use today.

From about 1794 to the late 1950s, when the canal-side flour mills were closed, narrowboats carried cargo such as coal, slate, gypsum or lead ore as well as finished lead (for roofing, water pipes and sewerage) from the leadworks in Egerton Street (Newtown). Grain from Cheshire was stored in granaries on the banks of the canal at Newtown and Boughton and salt for preserving food arrived from Northwich.

Proposed canal
The original plan to complete the Ellesmere Canal was to connect Chester directly to the Wrexham coalfields by building a broad-gauge waterway with a branch to the River Dee at Holt. If the waterway had been built, canal traffic would have crossed the Pontcysyllte Aqueduct heading north to Chester and the River Dee.

As the route was never completed, the short length of canal north of Trevor, near Wrexham was infilled. The Llangollen Canal, although designed to be primarily a water source from the River Dee, became a cruising waterway despite its inherent narrow nature.

However, although Wrexham itself was bypassed, the plan to join the rivers Severn, Mersey and Dee was completed, first by cutting the Wirral Arm from Chester to Ellesmere Port (Whitby wharf) then by extending the Llangollen Arm via Ellesmere, Whitchurch and Bettisfield Moss through to the Chester Canal at Hurleston. The network became the Shropshire Union Canal.

Trams
Chester had a tram service during the late 19th and early 20th centuries which ran from Saltney, on the Welsh border in the west, to Chester General station, and thence also to Tarvin Road and Great Boughton. It featured the narrowest gauge trams (3' 6") in mainland Britain, due to an act of Parliament which deemed that they must be the least obstructive possible.

The tramway was established in 1871 by Chester Tramways Company. It was horse-drawn until it was taken over by the council in 1903. Renamed as Chester Corporation Tramways, it was reconstructed to the 3'6" gauge, and electrified with overhead cables. The tramway was closed in February 1930, a fate experienced by most other systems in the UK. All that remains are small areas of uncovered track inside the former bus depot, and a few tram-wire supports attached to buildings on Eastgate/Foregate Street, although substantial sections of the track remain buried beneath the current road surface.

Chester electric tram number 4, built by G.F. Milnes & Co. in 1903, has been preserved by Hooton Park Trust and is currently undergoing restoration.

Sport

Football

Chester was home to Chester City F.C., who were founded in 1885 and elected to the Football League in 1931, and played at their Sealand Road stadium until 1990, spending two years playing in Macclesfield before returning to the city to the new Deva Stadium – which straddles the border of England and Wales – in 1992. The club first lost its Football League status in 2000, only to reclaim it four years later as Conference champions, but were relegated again in 2009 and went out of business in March 2010 after 125 years in existence.

Notable former players of the club include Ian Rush (who later managed the club), Cyrille Regis, Arthur Albiston, Earl Barrett, Lee Dixon, Steve Harkness, Roberto Martínez and Stan Pearson.

Following their demise, a new team – Chester FC – was founded. They play at Chester City's Deva Stadium, also known as the Chester Swansway Stadium for sponsorship reasons, and were elected to the Northern Premier League Division One North for the 2010–11 season, ending their first season as that division's champions, securing a place in the Northern Premier League Premier Division for the 2011–12 season. The club achieved promotion for the next two consecutive seasons and currently play in the National League Premier Division.

Basketball
The city also has a professional basketball team in the country's top competition, the British Basketball League. Cheshire Phoenix – formerly known as Cheshire Jets – play at the Cheshire Oaks Arena at nearby Ellesmere Port; and a wheelchair basketball team, Celtic Warriors, formerly known as the Chester Wheelchair Jets.

Rugby Union
Chester Rugby Club (union) plays in the English National League 2 North, having been promoted in 2012. It won the EDF Energy Intermediate Cup in the 2007–08 season and has also won the Cheshire Cup several times.

Watersports on the River Dee
The River Dee is home to rowing clubs, notably Grosvenor Rowing Club and Royal Chester Rowing Club, as well as two school clubs, The King's School Chester Rowing Club and Queen's Park High Rowing Club. The weir is used by a number of local canoe and kayak clubs. Each July the Chester Raft Race is held on the River Dee in aid of charity.

Horseracing
Chester Racecourse hosts several flat race meetings from the spring to the autumn. The races take place within view of the City walls and attract tens of thousands of visitors. The May meeting includes several nationally significant races such as the Chester Vase, which is recognised as a trial for The Derby.

Other sports
There is a successful hockey club, Chester HC, who play at the County Officers' Club on Plas Newton Lane, a Handball team Deva Handball Club, who boast to be the largest handball team in the country. Deva handball club play in National league 1 of handball, and also an American Football team, the Chester Romans, part of the British American Football League.

Chester Golf Club is near the banks of the Dee, and there are numerous private golf courses near the city, as well as a 9-hole municipal course at Westminster Park.

The Northgate Arena is the city's main leisure centre, there are smaller sports centres in Christleton and Upton. The Victorian City Baths are in the city centre.

December 2011 saw the first Chester Santa Dash. A  run around the streets of Chester in aid of local charities, the Santa Dash is a festive event open to everyone of all ages and abilities.

The city has hosted the RAC Rally eight times.

Twin towns
Chester is twinned with:
 Sens, France
 Lörrach, Loerrach International Germany
 Senigallia, Italy

Notable people

See :Category:People from Chester
 Waheed Arian, Afghan born, British doctor and radiologist
 Ian Blair (born 1953), retired Commissioner for the Metropolitan Police
 Sir Adrian Boult (1889–1983), musical conductor, born in Liverpool Road
 Randolph Caldecott (1846–86), artist and book illustrator, was born in Bridge Street, Chester
 Group Captain Leonard Cheshire VC, OM, DSO and Two Bars, DFC (1917–1992), Second World War RAF bomber pilot and founder of the Leonard Cheshire Disability charity, was born in Hoole Road, Hoole, Chester (although he was brought up in Oxford); the house where he was born (now a guest house) bears a blue plaque attesting to this
 Eileen de Coppet, Princess of Albania (1922–1985), the wife to the pretender of the throne of the Principality of Albania was born in Chester.
 John Douglas (1830–1911), architect, lived in and had his practice in Chester, and designed many of its Victorian buildings
David Evans, General Secretary of the Labour Party
 Leo Gradwell DSC (1899–1969), barrister and Arctic Convoys war hero
 A. S. Hornby (1898–1978), notable grammarian and lexicographer
 Conor Kostick (born 1964), writer and historian
 Rory Lewis (born 1982), portrait photographer
 Frank Eric Lloyd (1909–1992), author of Rhodesian Patrol, born in Chester
 William Monk R.E. (1863–1937), etcher, woodcut engraver and painter
 Peter Newbrook (1920–2009), cinematographer, director, producer and writer
 Simon Nixon (born 1967), billionaire businessman, co-founder of Moneysupermarket.com
 David Roberts (1859–1928), engineer who invented the caterpillar track, grew up in Great Boughton
 L. T. C. Rolt (1910–74), engineering historian, born in Chester
 Anthony Thwaite (1930–2021), poet and writer
 Beatrice Tinsley (née Hill) (1941–1981), astronomer and cosmologist, professor of astronomy at Yale University; was born in the city but was brought up in New Zealand
 Sir John Vanbrugh (1664–1726), architect and dramatist, raised in Chester

Actors
 Randle Ayrton (1869-1940) 
 Emily Booth (born 1976), actress and writer
 Adrian Bower (born 1970) 
 Ray Coulthard (born 1968) 
 Daniel Craig (born 1968 in Liverpool Road)
 Emma Cunniffe (born 1973) 
 Malcolm Hebden (born 1939 in Chester) 
 Tom Hughes (born 1985) 
 Hugh Lloyd (1923–2008)
 Ronald Pickup (1940–2021)
 Basil Radford (1897–1952)
 Graham Roberts (1929–2004) 
 John Steiner (1941–2022) 

Comedians
 Russ Abbot (born 1947) (birth name Russell Allan Roberts), musician, comedian and actor
 Jeff Green (born 1964), comedian
 Bob Mills (born 1957), comedian and gameshow host 
 Stevie Riks (born 1967), comedian, impressionist, and musician 

Sport
 Paul Butler (born 1988), IBF Bantamweight World champion boxer
 Danny Collins (born 1980), Sunderland A.F.C. footballer
 Steven Cousins (born 1972), skater
 Andy Dorman (born 1982), Crystal Palace F.C. footballer
 Doug Ellis (1924–2018), former owner of Aston Villa F.C., born in Hooton and educated in Chester
 Ben Foden (born 1985), rugby player England and Northampton Saints
 Tom Heaton (born 1986), Burnley F.C. goalkeeper
 Danny Murphy (born 1977), footballer and former England international
 Michael Owen (born 1979), former English football international and Liverpool F.C. player
 Antonio Pedroza (born 1991), former Crystal Palace footballer
 Alex Sanderson (born 1979), international rugby union player and younger brother of Pat
 Pat Sanderson (born 1977), international rugby union player
 Ryan Shawcross (born 1987), Stoke City F.C. footballer
 Stuart Tomlinson (born 1985), former professional footballer, now professional wrestler at WWE
 Stuart Turner (born 1943), former Essex cricketer
 Beth Tweddle (born 1985 in Johannesburg, South Africa), World champion gymnast, attended The Queen's School, Chester
 Martin Tyler (born 1945), English football commentator
 Ricky Walden (born 1982), professional snooker player
 Helen Willetts (born 1972), former badminton international and weather forecaster

Music
 Kutski (born 1982), DJ and BBC Radio 1 presenter
 Lee Latchford-Evans (born 1975), singer of 1990s pop group Steps
 Nemone Metaxas (born 1973), DJ and radio presenter
 Stephen Oliver (1950–92), composer
 Andie Rathbone (born 1969), drummer of Chester-based indie band Mansun
 Howard Skempton (born 1947), composer
 Steve Wright, singer of Juveniles, Fiat Lux, Camera Obscura and Hoi Poloi

Freedom of the City
The following people and military units have received the Freedom of the City of Chester.

Individuals
 Sir Thomas Grosvenor: 1677. 
 Major General His Grace Duke of Westminster : 1973.

Military Units
 The Cheshire Regiment: 1948.
 The Cheshire Yeomanry: 1996.
 , RN: 2003.
 1st Battalion The Mercian Regiment: 26 March 2008.
 1st Battalion The Royal Welsh

See also

 Grade I listed buildings in Chester
 All Saints Church, Hoole
 St Barnabas' Church, Chester
 St Mary's Church, Handbridge
 St Paul's Church, Boughton
 Chester (placename element) for other place names containing 'Chester', 'Cester', 'Caster' etc.

References

Notes

Bibliography

External links

An illustrated guide to Chester
 –  a detailed historical record about the Fortress Baths, Chester

 
Populated places established in the 1st century
County towns in England
Towns of the Welsh Marches
Fortified settlements
Rally GB
Unparished areas in Cheshire
Cities in North West England
Towns in Cheshire